The Logitech G29 is a racing wheel made by Logitech. It supports PlayStation 5, PlayStation 4, PlayStation 3 and PC. The Logitech G920 is its counterpart compatible with the Xbox Series X and Series S, Xbox One and PC, with different buttons and logos. It replaced the Logitech G27 in 2015, but retains the internal design and technical specifications. Its successor is the Logitech G923, released in August 2020, however, the G29 is still available for sale. They both share a similar exterior design.

The wheel features dual-motor force feedback and RPM shift indicator LEDs, is supplied with a pedal set (accelerator, brake and clutch) and an optional six-speed 'H pattern' gear shifter is available separately.

As of 2021, the G29 wheel and pedals retail at £220 and the optional shifter is £40 (GBP).

See also 
 List of Logitech Racing Wheels compatible games

References

Game controllers
Computer peripherals
Computing input devices
Products introduced in 2015
G29